Saphenista merana is a species of moth of the family Tortricidae. It is found in Pastaza Province, Ecuador.

The wingspan is about 16 mm. The ground colour of the forewings is brownish ochreous, mixed with brown in the dorsal and posterior parts of the wing. The hindwings are dark brown.

References

Moths described in 2002
Saphenista